The 1990 Georgia Southern Eagles football team represented Georgia Southern University as an independent during the 1990 NCAA Division I-AA football season. Georgia Southern was led by first-year head football coach Tim Stowers and played their home games at Paulson Stadium.

The Eagles won the national championship for the second consecutive season—their fourth overall in six years—and it was their third straight national championship game appearance. Georgia Southern defeated Nevada 36–13 in their home stadium to claim the championship.

Schedule

References

External links
 1990 Football Media Guide at gseagles.com

Georgia Southern
Georgia Southern Eagles football seasons
NCAA Division I Football Champions
Georgia Southern Eagles football